Villard, also known as Villard Books, is a publishing imprint of Random House, one of the largest publishing companies in the world, owned by Bertelsmann since 1998 and grouped in Penguin Random House since 2013. It was founded in 1983. Villard began as an independent imprint of Random House and is currently a sub-imprint of Ballantine Books, itself an imprint of Random House. It was named after a Stanford White brownstone mansion on Madison Avenue that was the home of Random House for twenty years.

Books

1985
The Bill James Historical Baseball Abstract, Bill James

1987
Learned Pigs & Fireproof Women, Ricky Jay
Pattern Crimes, William Bayer
1988
All I Really Need to Know I Learned in Kindergarten, Robert Fulghum

1989
Jacob the Baker: Gentle Wisdom for a Complicated World, Noah Benshea

1990
Latin for All Occasions, Henry Beard

1991
Kiss the Hand You Cannot Bite: Rise and Fall of the Ceauşescus, Edward Behr
1992
Let Me Take You Down: Inside the Mind of Mark David Chapman, the Man Who Shot John Lennon, Jack Jones
The Official Politically Correct Dictionary and Handbook, Henry Beard and Christopher Cerf

1993
Different Loving: the World of Sexual Dominance and Submission, Gloria Brame
Hate on Trial: The Case Against America's Most Dangerous Neo-Nazi, Morris Dees & Steve Fiffer
The Fifties, David Halberstam
Primal Fear, William Diehl

1994
Behind the Times: Inside the New New York Times, Edwin Diamond.
Same-Sex Unions in Pre-Modern Europe,  John Boswell
Saved by the Light: The True Story of a Man who Died Twice and the Profound Revelations He Received, Dannion Brinkley and Paul Perry, 
Mary Cassatt: A Life,  Nancy Mowll Mathews
The Official NBA Basketball Encyclopedia

1995
Bone in the Throat, Anthony Bourdain
The Grand Ole Opry: History of Country Music. 70 Years of the Songs, the Stars and the Stories, Paul Kingsbury
Wonder Boys, Michael Chabon

1996
Into the Wild, Jon Krakauer
The Sparrow, Mary Doria Russell
1997
Gone Bamboo, Anthony Bourdain.
Into Thin Air: A Personal Account of the Mt. Everest Disaster, Jon Krakauer

1998
Children of God, Mary Doria Russell
2000
The Very Persistent Gappers of Frip, written by George Saunders, illustrated by Lane Smith
Anthropology: And a Hundred Other Stories, Dan Rhodes 
2001
Necessary Targets, Eve Ensler
2003
Vagabonding: An uncommon guide to the art of long-term world travel, Rolf Potts
A Round-Heeled Woman: My Late-Life Adventures in Sex and Romance, Jane Juska
2004
Counterculture Through the Ages: From Abraham to Acid House, Ken Goffman.
2005
What We Do Is Secret, Thorn Kief Hillsbery
Zanesville, Kris Saknussemm
2006
The Gospel of the Flying Spaghetti Monster, Bobby Henderson
2007
Hack: How I Stopped Worrying About What to Do with My Life and Started Driving a Yellow Cab, written by Melissa Plaut
Macedonia, written by Harvey Pekar and Heather Roberson, with illustrations by Ed Piskor
Check the Technique: Liner Notes for Hip-Hop Junkies, Brian Coleman

2008
Nose Down, Eyes Up, Merrill Markoe
The Big Skinny, Carol Lay
How Can I Keep From Singing (revised edition), biography of Pete Seeger, by David Dunaway
The presidential book of lists: from most to least, elected to rejected, worst to cursed: Fascinating facts about our chief executives, Ian Randal Strock

2009
Farewell, My Subaru, Doug Fine

2010
I Am an Emotional Creature: The Secret Life of Girls Around the World, Eve Ensler

External links
 Villard - publisher's website

References

Random House
Book publishing companies of the United States
Publishing companies established in 1983
Lists of books
Villard (imprint) books
1980 establishments in New York City